Senator Johnston may refer to:

Members of the Australian Senate
Bertie Johnston (1880–1942), Australian Senator from Western Australia from 1929 to 1942
David Johnston (Australian politician) (born 1956), Australian Senator from Western Australia from 2002 to 2016

Members of the Canadian Senate
John Frederick Johnston (1876–1948), Canadian Senator from Saskatchewan from 1943 to 1948

Members of the Northern Irish Senate
James Johnston (Northern Ireland politician) (1849–1924), Northern Irish Senator from 1921 to 1924
John Stewart Johnston (born 1906), Northern Irish Senator from 1958 to 1965 and from 1967 to 1973
William Ernest George Johnston (1884–1951), Northern Irish Senator from 1949 to 1951

Members of the United States Senate
J. Bennett Johnston (born 1932), U.S. Senator from Louisiana from 1972 to 1997
John W. Johnston (1818–1889), U.S. Senator from Virginia from 1870 to 1883
Joseph F. Johnston (1843–1913), U.S. Senator from Alabama from 1907 to 1913
Josiah S. Johnston (1784–1833), U.S. Senator from Louisiana from 1824 to 1833
Olin D. Johnston (1896–1965), U.S. Senator from South Carolina from 1945 to 1965
Rienzi Melville Johnston (1849–1926), U.S. Senator from Texas in 1913; also served in the Texas State Senate
Samuel Johnston (1733–1816), U.S. Senator from North Carolina from 1789 to 1793

United States state senate members
David Emmons Johnston (1845–1917), West Virginia State Senate
George Doherty Johnston (1832–1910), Alabama State Senate
Harry Johnston (American politician) (born 1931), Florida State Senate
Henry S. Johnston (1867–1965), Oklahoma State Senate
J. Mark Johnston (born 1962), South Dakota State Senate 
James Johnston (Colonel) (1740s–1805), North Carolina State Senate
Joseph F. Johnston (1843–1913), Alabama State Senate
Mike Johnston (Colorado politician) (born 1974), Colorado State Senate
Patrick Johnston (American politician) (born 1946), California State Senate
Rod Johnston (1937–2018), Wisconsin State Senate
Thomas D. Johnston (1840–1902), North Carolina State Senate
W. Broughton Johnston (1905–1978), West Virginia State Senate
William Agnew Johnston (1848–1937), Kansas State Senate

See also
Archibald Johnstone (1924–2014), Canadian Senator from Prince Edward Island from 1998 to 1999
Senator Johnson (disambiguation)